Kleinstein is a surname. Notable people with the surname include:

Jared Kleinstein, (born 1987), originator of the term tebowing
Rami Kleinstein (born 1962), Israeli singer and composer
Zelman Kleinstein (1910–after 1939), Palestine/Israeli chess master